Tha Eastsidaz is a hip hop trio consisting of Snoop Dogg, Tray Deee and Goldie Loc. Their first appearance was on Tommy Boy Records' The Ride: Music from Dimension with Crooked Eye Q on a Battlecat-produced song called "Feels So Good" in 1997.

History

Emergence (1997-2003) 
In 1997, after Snoop Dogg left Death Row records, he formed 'The Eastsiders' with Crooked I and Li'l C-Style. They released one song commercially 'Feels So Good' on the soundtrack for the film Ride (1998 film). The group was briefly under contract with Virgin records, however no other songs were released besides few other songs were leaked on the internet in 1999.

It took another two years for the revival of the ensemble and they formed again in 2000, with a new line-up made up of Snoop Dogg, Tray Deee, and Goldie Loc. The name was also changed to 'Tha Eastsidaz', possibly due to contractual obligations with Virgin Records. After signing on to Snoop's Doggystyle Records, distributed by TVT, they released their debut album, Snoop Dogg Presents Tha Eastsidaz; which was a hit and eventually went platinum.  They were also featured on "Lay Low," a hit single from Snoop Dogg's album Tha Last Meal and the soundtrack to the horror film Bones, which starred Snoop as the title character. The next year, they released their second album, Duces 'n Trayz: The Old Fashioned Way. The album was critically well-received, but only certified gold.

Breakup (2003-2014) 
The group broke up when Snoop left while making their second album and Tray Deee was being sentenced to 12 years in prison for attempted murder. In 2005, Goldie Loc and Snoop Dogg reunited to form Tha Eastsidaz; they released a new joint album with the IV Life Family. Goldie Loc was also involved in The Warzone with MC Eiht and Kam.

The group also appeared in two films. They were featured in the 2001 film Baby Boy and their self-titled direct-to-video crime film, which was a success in retail sales despite the extremely low-budget production thus was certified double platinum.

Reunion (2014-2016) 
On April 3, 2014, Tray Deee was released from California Men's Colony, where he had been incarcerated since 2005 on attempted murder charges. On April 18 and 19, Tray Deee and Goldie Loc will reunite as Tha Eastsidaz to perform at "Krush Groove 2014" at Save Mart Center in Fresno, California and The Forum in Inglewood. Tray Deee has stated that it is unlikely that there will ever be another Eastsidaz album.

Second reunion (2022-present) 
On February 4, 2022, Tray Deee announced new upcoming music from Tha Eastsidaz. On February 9, 2022, Goldie Loc confirmed a new Eastsidaz album.

Discography

Studio albums
 Tha Eastsidaz (2000)
 Duces 'n Trayz: The Old Fashioned Way (2001)

Mixtapes
 That's My Work Volume 4 (2014)

Filmography 
 2000 Tha Eastsidaz
 2001 Baby Boy
 2001 The Wash
 2003 Crime Partners

Awards 
 Won at the 2000 Source Awards : New Artist of the Year, Group.

References

External links 
 Interview with Tha Eastsidaz

Hip hop groups from California
Snoop Dogg
TVT Records artists
Musicians from Long Beach, California
American musical trios
Gangsta rap groups
G-funk groups